Signe Søes (born 1983) is a Danish orienteering competitor. She won a silver medal in the short distance at the 2003 Junior World Orienteering Championships in Põlva. She placed fourth in the sprint, 10th in the middle and 12th in the long distance at the 2009 World Orienteering Championships in Miskolc. At the 2008 and 2010 World Cups, she placed 2nd. At the European Championships 2014 at Palmela, Portugal, Søes became European Champion in the middle distance winning a gold medal.

References

External links
 

1983 births
Living people
Danish orienteers
Foot orienteers
Female orienteers
Competitors at the 2009 World Games
Competitors at the 2005 World Games
Junior World Orienteering Championships medalists